White House Farm may refer to:

White House Farm (Chestertown, Maryland), listed on the National Register of Historic Places in Maryland
White House Farm (Jefferson County, West Virginia), listed on the National Register of Historic Places in West Virginia
White House Farm murders, Essex, England, August 1985
White House Farm (TV series), a 2020 British crime drama miniseries based on the murders

See also
White House (disambiguation)
E.M. White Dairy Barn, Tempe, Arizona, listed on the NRHP in Maricopa County
White-Plumb Farm, Greeley, Colorado, listed on the NRHP in Weld County
T.L. White Barn, Bendena, Kansas, listed on the NRHP in Doniphan County
McMurdie-White Farmstead, Paradise, Utah, listed on the NRHP in Cache County